In mathematics, a sequence of functions  from a set S to a metric space M is said to be uniformly Cauchy if:

 For all , there exists  such that for all :  whenever .

Convergence criteria 
A sequence of functions {fn} from S to M is pointwise Cauchy if, for each x ∈ S, the sequence {fn(x)} is a Cauchy sequence in M.  This is a weaker condition than being uniformly Cauchy.  

In general a sequence can be pointwise Cauchy and not pointwise convergent, or it can be uniformly Cauchy and not uniformly convergent.  Nevertheless, if the metric space M is complete, then any pointwise Cauchy sequence converges pointwise to a function from S to M.  Similarly, any uniformly Cauchy sequence will tend uniformly to such a function.

The uniform Cauchy property is frequently used when the S is not just a set, but a topological space, and M is a complete metric space.  The following theorem holds:

 Let S be a topological space and M a complete metric space.  Then any uniformly Cauchy sequence of continuous functions fn : S → M tends uniformly to a unique continuous function f : S → M.

Generalization to uniform spaces 

A sequence of functions  from a set S to a uniform space U is said to be uniformly Cauchy if:

 For all  and for any entourage , there exists  such that  whenever .

See also
Modes of convergence (annotated index)

Functional analysis
Convergence (mathematics)